Teresópolis Futebol Clube, commonly known as Teresópolis, is a Brazilian football club based in Teresópolis, Rio de Janeiro state.

History
The club was founded on August 4, 1915, in Alto neighborhood. Teresópolis professionalized its football department in 1989.

Stadium
Teresópolis Futebol Clube play their home games at Estádio Antônio Savattone. The stadium has a maximum capacity of 8,000 people.

References

Association football clubs established in 1915
Football clubs in Rio de Janeiro (state)
Teresópolis
1915 establishments in Brazil